The Chamber of Representatives is the lower house of the General Assembly of Uruguay (Asamblea General de Uruguay). The Chamber has 99 members, elected for a five-year term by proportional representation with at least two members per department.

The composition and powers of the Chamber of Representatives are established by Article Ninety of the Uruguayan Constitution. It also requires that members must be aged at least 25 and have been a citizen of Uruguay for five years. It is the competence of the Chamber of Representatives to accuse in the Senate members of both houses, the President and Vice President of the Republic, the Ministers of State, the members of the Supreme Court, the Administrative Litigation Court, the Court of Accounts and the Electoral Court, either for violating the Constitution or other serious crimes.

Latest elections

Representatives

President 

The Presidency of the Chamber is renewed at the beginning of each session. Every year, a Representative is elected by the rest of the members as its President. The current officerholder of the Chamber of Representatives is Sebastián Andújar, who took office on March 1, 2023.

Historical seat division

1989–1994

1994–1999

1999–2004

2004–2009

2009–2014

2014–2019

2019–

See also 

General Assembly of Uruguay
Chamber of Senators of Uruguay
Elections in Uruguay

References

External links
Official website House of Representatives of Uruguay (Spanish)
Politics Data Bank at the Social Sciences School - Universidad de la República (Uruguay)

Uruguay
General Assembly of Uruguay
1830 establishments in Uruguay